Shell Rock may refer to:
 Shell Rock Natural Area, a protected area in Baca County, Colorado, USA
 Shell Rock Township, Butler County, Iowa, a township in Iowa
 Shell Rock, Iowa, a city in this township
 Shell Rock Township, Freeborn County, Minnesota, a township in
 Shell Rock River, the namesake of the locations in Iowa and Minnesota, USA
 Shell Rock Township, Greenwood County, Kansas, a township in
 Shell Rock (San Marcos, Texas)